"Alone" is a song by American rock band Falling in Reverse. It served as the lead single for the band's second studio album Fashionably Late.

Music video
The music video contains the band performing while girls dance around them with shots of Radke in an electric blue Stacy Adams suit walking down an airport runway with a Ferrari 458 Italia  driving beside him.

Critical reception
The song was described by Zoiks! Online as, "Blending big radio beats with moshpit inducing riffage, the track addresses Ronnie's critics head-on." In a press statement, Radke stated that "Alone" was, "... Everything I've ever wanted to say to all these Twitter followers that talk shit... [and] I wanted to let everyone that dedicates their lives to just one genre of music know why they are so unhappy."

Personnel
 Ronnie Radke – lead vocals
 Jacky Vincent – lead guitar
 Derek Jones – rhythm guitar, backing vocals
 Ryan Seaman – drums, percussion, backing vocals
 Ron Ficarro – bass, backing vocals

Charts

Accolades

References

2013 songs
2013 singles
Falling in Reverse songs
Rapcore songs
Epitaph Records singles
Songs written by Ronnie Radke